Queas and Art is a compilation album by Vas Deferens Organization, released in 1998 through Eerie Materials. It contains material from the band's first five cassette tapes, dating from 1992 to 1995.

Track listing

Personnel 
Regan Boon
Craig Carlton
Matt Castille
Barbara Cohen
Jason Cohen
Eric Lumbleau
Breck Outland

References 

1998 compilation albums
Vas Deferens Organization albums